Domingo Omar Aguilar Cardenas (born December 1, 1959) is a retired male long-distance runner from Chile, who represented his native country twice at the Summer Olympics: 1984 and 1988.



Career

He was torch lighter for the 1986 South American Games at the Estadio Nacional in Santiago, Chile.

In addition to his successes on the track, he won the men's race at the first two editions of the South American Cross Country Championships.

Achievements

References

sports-reference

1959 births
Living people
Chilean male long-distance runners
Athletes (track and field) at the 1984 Summer Olympics
Athletes (track and field) at the 1988 Summer Olympics
Athletes (track and field) at the 1983 Pan American Games
Athletes (track and field) at the 1987 Pan American Games
Olympic athletes of Chile
Pan American Games medalists in athletics (track and field)
Pan American Games bronze medalists for Chile
South American Games gold medalists for Chile
South American Games silver medalists for Chile
South American Games bronze medalists for Chile
South American Games medalists in athletics
Competitors at the 1982 Southern Cross Games
Competitors at the 1986 South American Games
Medalists at the 1987 Pan American Games
20th-century Chilean people